Montferrat may refer to:

 Montferrat (in Italian, Monferrato), a historical region in north Italy, later integrated in Piedmont
 March of Montferrat - a former sovereign state, transformed into a Duchy in 1574 by the Gonzagas of Mantua, who acquired the territory.

Communes in France
 Montferrat, Isère, in the Isère département
 Montferrat, Var, in the Var département

See also
List of rulers of Montferrat